James Toru Uno was the Anglican Bishop of Osaka prior to the consecration of Samuel Osamu Onishi in September 2008.

Notes

External links
 Diocese History

Anglican bishops of Osaka
Living people
Japanese Anglican bishops
Year of birth missing (living people)
Place of birth missing (living people)